Magmar may refer to:
Magmar (Pokémon), a Pokémon species
Magmar, one of the Evil Rock Lords in the Rock Lords toy line